For the Rolando Cruz related to the Illinois criminal case, see Rolando Cruz case

Rolando Cruz (born September 17, 1939 in Salinas, Puerto Rico) is a former pole vaulter from Puerto Rico. He trained under Jimmy Curran at Mercersburg Academy and Jim 'Jumbo' Elliott at Villanova University. He competed for his native country in three consecutive Summer Olympics, starting in 1956. He is a three-time gold medalist at the Central American and Caribbean Games: 1959, 1962 and 1966.

Cruz later became a lawyer and president of a life insurance company. From 1977 to 1981 he served as Commissioner Of Insurance of Puerto Rico.

References

sports-reference
1963 Video

1939 births
Olympic track and field athletes of Puerto Rico
Athletes (track and field) at the 1956 Summer Olympics
Athletes (track and field) at the 1959 Pan American Games
Athletes (track and field) at the 1960 Summer Olympics
Athletes (track and field) at the 1964 Summer Olympics
Living people
People from Salinas, Puerto Rico
Puerto Rican male pole vaulters
Pan American Games bronze medalists for Puerto Rico
Pan American Games medalists in athletics (track and field)
Central American and Caribbean Games gold medalists for Puerto Rico
Competitors at the 1959 Central American and Caribbean Games
Competitors at the 1962 Central American and Caribbean Games
Competitors at the 1966 Central American and Caribbean Games
Central American and Caribbean Games medalists in athletics
Medalists at the 1959 Pan American Games